Bowen Lockwood (born 1 July 1978) is a former Australian rules footballer in the Australian Football League.

Originally from Mount Eliza, Lockwood attended Geelong College and was recruited from Geelong U18 in the 1996 AFL Draft at pick number 7.

AFL career
Touted as a possible key forward for Port Adelaide, Lockwood earned a Rising Star nomination in 1997, his debut year. 

After a training incident in 1999 where Lockwood picked up a ball and was crashed into by a teammate, he had continual problems with a bulging disc injury. He played only six games in 1999 and ten in 2000. 

He continued to struggle, playing four games in 2001. In 2002 he remained on Port's list but announced his retirement that season at only 24 due to chronic injury.

External links

Bowen Lockwood Profile on ThePowerFromPort.com.au

1978 births
Living people
Port Adelaide Football Club players
Port Adelaide Football Club players (all competitions)
Australian rules footballers from Victoria (Australia)
People educated at Geelong College
Geelong Falcons players
Port Adelaide Magpies players